Abbas Atwi may refer to:

Abbas Ahmed Atwi (born 1979), a Lebanese association football player
Abbas Ali Atwi (born 1984), a Lebanese association football player